Brad D. Smith is an American businessman and the former chief executive officer of Intuit. He held the position from 2008 to 2018. On October 28, 2021, Smith was named president of Marshall University, his alma mater.

Early life and education
Smith grew up in Kenova, West Virginia. He attended Ceredo-Kenova High School and attended the United States Military Academy at West Point upon graduation for one semester. After West Point, Smith enrolled at Marshall University and received his bachelor's degree in 1986. Smith earned his master's degree in management and leadership development from Aquinas College in 1991.

Career
Smith began his career with positions at Pepsi Bottling Group and 7Up Co. He was the vice president for Field Marketing at ADVO from 1992 to 1996.  Smith was a senior vice president of marketing and business development at ADP from 1996 to 2003 before joining Intuit. Smith joined Intuit in February 2003 and held several positions in the company. He became Intuit's chief executive officer in January 2008, succeeding Steve Bennett.

In August 2018, Smith announced that he would step down as Intuit's CEO at the end of 2018, while staying on as the company's executive board chairman. His position was passed to Sasan Goodarzi.

In 2017, Smith joined the board of directors at SurveyMonkey. Smith joined the board of directors at Nordstrom in 2013.

References

Living people
Year of birth missing (living people)
20th-century American businesspeople
21st-century American businesspeople
American chief executives of financial services companies
American corporate directors
American philanthropists
Aquinas College (Michigan) alumni
Businesspeople from West Virginia
Directors of Yahoo!
Intuit people
Marshall University alumni
People from Huntington, West Virginia
People from Kenova, West Virginia
Presidents of Marshall University
Philanthropists from West Virginia